Juan Francisco de la Cerda Enríquez de Ribera (Medinaceli, 4 November 1637 – Madrid, 20 February 1691), 8th Duke of Medinaceli, 7th Marquis de Cogolludo, 4th  Marquis of Alcalá de la Alameda, 6th Duke of Alcalá de los Gazules, 9th Count of Los Molares, 9th Marquis of Tarifa, 8th Count of El Puerto de Santa María, was a Spanish noble and politician, and valido of King Charles II of Spain.

Biography 

Don Juan Francisco was the son of Antonio de la Cerda, 7th Duke of Medinaceli and Ana María Luisa Enríquez de Ribera Portocarrero y Cárdenas, 5th Duchess of Alcalá de los Gazules.
By his marriage to Catalina de Aragón, Don Juan Francisco added the titles of Duke of Segorbe, Cardona and Lerma to the House of Medinaceli.

In 1677, John of Austria the Younger, the illegitimate half-brother of Charles II( who was young and inexperienced) had removed the Queen Mother Mariana from court, and established himself as prime minister. Great hopes were entertained for his administration, but it proved disappointing and short: Don John died on 17 September 1679.

As his predecessors, Don Juan Francisco was a loyal servant of the Spanish Crown, and after the death of John of Austria, he became the Valido of King Charles II.
Also Sumiller de Corps and Caballerizo mayor to the King, he drastically reformed the economy through the Junta de Comercio y Moneda, but his monetary devaluation led to collapse of the prices and speculation on grain, which led to several bankruptcies.

In several regions of Spain, food riots broke out, which led together with the humiliating Truce of Ratisbon with France, to the resignation of Don Juan Francisco. He retired from politics and  
died in 1691. All his titles went to his son Luis Francisco de la Cerda.

References 

 Fundación Medinaceli.

External links 

1637 births
1691 deaths
People from the Province of Soria
Dukes of Medinaceli
Marquesses of Spain
Counts of Spain
Spanish politicians